Bennie Green (April 16, 1923 – March 23, 1977) was an American jazz trombonist.

Born in Chicago, Illinois, United States, Green worked in the orchestras of Earl Hines and Charlie Ventura, and recorded as bandleader through the 1950s and 1960s. According to critic Scott Yanow of AllMusic, Green's style straddled swing music and soul, making him one of the few trombonists of the 1950s and '60s uninfluenced by the pioneering sound of J.J. Johnson.

Green relocated to Las Vegas, where he played in hotel bands for the last decade of his career, though he made occasional appearances at jazz festivals. He died on March 23, 1977.

Discography

As leader
 Bennie Green Blows His Horn (Prestige, 1955)
 Bennie Green with Art Farmer (Prestige, 1956)
 Blow Your Horn (Decca, 1956)
 Walking Down (Prestige, 1956)
 Back on the Scene (Blue Note, 1958)
 Soul Stirrin' (Blue Note, 1958)
 The 45 Session (Blue Note, 1958)
 The Swingin'est (Vee Jay, 1959)
 Walkin & Talkin (Blue Note, 1959)
 Bennie Green Swings the Blues (Enrica, 1960)
 Glidin' Along (Jazzland, 1961)
 Hornful of Soul (Bethlehem, 1961)
 My Main Man (Argo, 1964) – with Sonny Stitt

As sideman
 Count Basie, Basie Rides Again (Verve, 1961)
 George Benson, The George Benson Cookbook (Columbia, 1967)
 Booker Ervin, Booker 'n' Brass (Pacific Jazz, 1967)
 Buck Clayton, Jumpin' at the Woodside (Columbia, 1955)
 Buck Clayton, All the Cats Join In (Columbia, 1956)
 Sonny Criss, Intermission Riff (Pablo, 1988)
 Miles Davis, Blue Period, 
 Miles Davis Miles Davis and Horns, 
 Duke Ellington, Second Sacred Concert (Fantasy, 1968)
 Duke Ellington, Up in Duke's Workshop (Pablo, 1979)
 Slim Gaillard, Opera in Vout (Verve, 1982)
 Earl Hines, Varieties! (Xanadu, 1985)
 Jackie & Roy, Jackie and Roy (Regent, 1957)
 Jo Jones, The Jo Jones Special (Vanguard, 1955)
 Jo Jones, Smooth Jazz (Everest, 1960)
 Melba Liston, Melba Liston and Her 'Bones (Metrojazz, 1959)
 Howard McGhee, Dusty Blue (Parlophone, 1960)
 Cecil Payne, The Connection (Charlie Parker, 1962)
 Ike Quebec, Congo Lament (Blue Note, 1981)
 Ike Quebec, Easy Living (Blue Note, 1987)
 Sonny Stitt, My Main Man (Argo, 1964)
 Sonny Stitt, Pow! (Prestige, 1966)
 Sarah Vaughan, Sarah Vaughan in Hi-Fi (Columbia, 1955)
 Charlie Ventura, It's All Bop to Me (RCA Victor, 1955)
 Charlie Ventura, Jumping with Ventura (EmArcy, 1955)
 Randy Weston, Destry Rides Again (United Artists, 1959)
 Joe Williams, Everyday I Have the Blues (Savoy, 1984)
 Kai Winding & J. J. Johnson, Jazz Workshop Vol. 2: Trombone Rapport (Debut, 1955)
 Kai Winding & J. J. Johnson, Kai and Jay, Bennie Green with Strings (Prestige, 1956)
 Kai Winding & J. J. Johnson & Bennie Green & Willie Dennis, Four Trombones (Debut, 1957)

References

1923 births
1977 deaths
Musicians from Chicago
Jazz musicians from Illinois
20th-century American male musicians
20th-century American musicians
20th-century trombonists
American jazz trombonists
American male jazz musicians
Male trombonists
Blue Note Records artists
Jubilee Records artists
Prestige Records artists
Vee-Jay Records artists